Brahmasthram may refer to:

Brahmasthram (1989 film), a Malayalam film starring Ambika
Brahmasthram (2010 film), a Malayalam film starring Saiju Kurup and Maidhili

See also
Brahmastram, a 2007 Telugu filmstarring Jagapathi Babu